Fini Scad were an Australian alternative rock band of the 1990s.  They had a minor hit with their single "Coppertone", which reached No. 42 in the 1996 Triple J Hottest 100. At the ARIA Music Awards of 1997, the band were nominated for two awards. They released one album, Wider Screen in 1998, and disbanded later the same year.

Members 
 Dave Thomas – vocals, rhythm guitar
 Bill Coupland – lead guitar
 Lincoln Beecroft – bass guitar
 John (Jono) McPhee – drums

Discography

Albums

Extended plays

Singles

Notes

Awards and nominations

ARIA Music Awards
The ARIA Music Awards is an annual awards ceremony that recognises excellence, innovation, and achievement across all genres of Australian music. They commenced in 1987.

! 
|-
|rowspan="3"| 1997
|rowspan="2"| "Coppertone" / "Testrider"
| ARIA Award for Best New Talent
| 
|rowspan="3"| 
|-
| ARIA Award for Breakthrough Artist – Single
| 
|-
| Tim Whitten for Furious
| ARIA Award for Producer of the Year
| 
|-

References

Australian alternative rock groups